Alarm is a 2008 Irish thriller film written and directed by Gerard Stembridge and starring Ruth Bradley and Aidan Turner.

Overview 
Alarm was filmed primarily in Dublin, Ireland.  The lead actors are Aidan Turner (known for his role as Kíli in the film series The Hobbit) and Ruth Bradley (known for playing Garda Lisa Nolan in Grabbers).

Premise 
After witnessing the murder of her father by burglars, Molly is living with friends and seeing a psychiatrist (Emmet Bergin) to deal with her panic attacks.  She dreams of finding a house where she can live alone.  Upon buying her dream house in a Dublin suburb, she gives a house-warming party and one of her friends brings along an old classmate of Molly's, Mal.  Molly had fancied Mal during school, and now they become a couple.  With a new house and a new boyfriend, things seem perfect.

However, her house is soon burgled again and again, although her neighbours are spared. Molly suspects that someone she knows might be involved.

Cast  
 Ruth Bradley as Molly
 Aidan Turner as Mal
 Owen Roe as Joe and Mossie
 Tom Hickey as Frank
 Anita Reeves as Jessie
 Emmet Bergin as Psychiatrist
 Alan Howley as Peter 
 Fionnuala Murphy as Receptionist 
 Alan Martin Walsh

Release 
Alarm was shown at the Irish cinema in 2008. On 30 November 2010 an American DVD was published by the IFC Film studios.

Critical reception 
When director and writer Gerard Stembridge introduced Alarm to the audience he said that he had wanted to do a "swan song for the Celtic tiger" (i.e. Ireland's economic boom in the 1990s). Furthermore, he had wanted to create a good old-fashioned thriller. However, critics doubt that he succeeded with this, noting that the plot is predictable. Many scenes were filmed at night and the action during these scenes is hard to see.

References

External links 
 

Films shot in Ireland
English-language Irish films
English-language Swedish films
2008 films
Films set in Dublin (city)
2008 thriller drama films
Irish thriller drama films
Films set in Ireland
Films shot in the Republic of Ireland
2008 drama films
2000s English-language films